Gabriel Fortier (born February 6, 2000) is a Canadian professional ice hockey forward who is currently playing for the Syracuse Crunch in the American Hockey League (AHL) as a prospect to the Tampa Bay Lightning of the National Hockey League (NHL). Fortier was drafted in the 2018 NHL Entry Draft in the second round (59th) by the Lightning.

Playing career

Junior

Fortier was selected 4th overall in the 2016 Quebec Major Junior Hockey League (QMJHL) entry level draft by the Baie-Comeau Drakkar. 

On June 23, 2018, the Lightning selected Fortier with the 59th overall pick in the 2nd-round of the 2018 NHL Entry Draft. Fortier recorded 26 goals and 33 assists during his draft year with the Baie-Comeau Drakkar. 

On January 2, 2020, the Drakkar traded Fortier to the Moncton Wildcats of the QMJHL. Fortier finished his career with the Drakkar having scored 191 points over 195 games. Fortier was also captain of the Drakkar prior to the trade to Moncton.

Professional

On November 29, 2021, Fortier was recalled by the Lightning. On November 30, 2021, Fortier made his NHL debut with the Lightning against the St. Louis Blues at the Enterprise Center.

Career statistics

Regular season and playoffs

International

References

External links
 

2000 births
Living people
Baie-Comeau Drakkar players
Canadian ice hockey left wingers
Moncton Wildcats players
Syracuse Crunch players
Tampa Bay Lightning draft picks
Tampa Bay Lightning players
Ice hockey players at the 2016 Winter Youth Olympics
Youth Olympic silver medalists for Canada